Gernot Schiefer (born 1964 in Düsseldorf) is a German psychologist and psychoanalyst. He is a professor of business psychology and head of the Competence Center for Qualitative Research at the FOM University of Applied Sciences for Economics and Management in Mannheim.

Career 
During his psychology studies at University of Cologne, he focused on psychological morphology as a student of Wilhelm Salber. After graduating in 1991, he was licensed as a psychological psychotherapist for adults in 1999. In 2003, as a student of Rainer Krause among others, he completed training as a psychoanalyst at the Saarland Institute for Psychoanalysis and Psychotherapy (SIPP) in Saarbrücken.

In 2006, Schiefer completed his doctorate at the Ludwig Maximilian University of Munich under the supervision of Lutz von Rosenstiel and graduated with a dissertation at the Technical University of Munich with the degree of Dr. oec.

Since 2012, Schiefer has been a professor of business psychology with a focus on human resources and management at the FOM Hochschule für Oekonomie & Management in Mannheim.

From 1995 to 2014, Schiefer was, together with a partner, managing director of an internationally active marketing consultancy and market research company, which mainly conducted market and advertising psychology research.

Research interests 
As head of the Competence Centre for Qualitative Research Gernot Schiefer pursues a hermeneutic, qualitative-methodological research approach. Among other things, he investigates post-heroic leadership concepts and integrates psychoanalytical perspectives and methods. Since 2020, Schiefer has been a member of the DBVC German Federal Coaching Association as a scientific expert for coaching and works there on the scientific foundation of coaching processes.

Monographs 

 Motive des Blutspendens. Eine tiefenpsychologische Untersuchung mit Gestaltungsoptionen für das Marketing von Nonprofit-Organisationen des Blutspendewesens, Gabler Verlag, Wiesbaden 2006, ISBN  978-3-8350-0572-3 (= Dissertation).
 with Ramona Gattner: Neuroleadership – die Grundannahmen in kritischer Analyse. Was Neurowissenschaften zur Zukunft von Führungstheorien wirklich beitragen, Springer, Wiesbaden 2019, ISBN 978-3-658-23477-5.
 with Corinna Hoffmann: Lernmotivation und Weiterbildungsbereitschaft älterer Mitarbeiter. Hilfestellung für Führungskräfte im Rahmen agiler Personalführung, Springer, Wiesbaden 2019, ISBN 978-3-658-26124-5.
 with Hanna Nitsche: Die Rolle der Führungskraft in agilen Organisationen. Wie Führungskräfte und Unternehmen jetzt umdenken sollten, Springer, Wiesbaden 2019, ISBN 978-3-658-27436-8.
 with Laura Gehrlein: Nostalgie als Stimmungsaufheller. Eine Einführung in die psychologischen Auswirkungen des nostalgischen Erinnerns, Springer, Wiesbaden 2021, ISBN 978-3-658-34100-8.
 with Corinna Hoffmann: Older Employees' Motivation to Learn an Readiness for Training. Assistance for Leaders in the Context of Agile Personnel Management, Springer Wiesbaden 2021, ISBN 978-3-658-35724-5.

References

External links 
 

German psychoanalysts
German psychologists
1964 births
Living people
Academic staff of FOM University of Applied Sciences for Economics and Management
University of Cologne alumni
Ludwig Maximilian University of Munich alumni
Technical University of Munich alumni